Jorge Roberto Cerino (born April 28, 1971 in Buenos Aires, Argentina) is a former Argentine footballer who played for clubs of Argentina, Chile, Peru, Canada and Ecuador. He played as a winger.

Teams
  Newell's Old Boys 1991–1992
  Atlético Tucumán 1992–1993
  Coquimbo Unido 1993–1994
  LDU Quito 1994–1995
  Deportes La Serena 1996–1997
  Unión Española 1998–1999
  Santiago Morning 2000–2002
  Cienciano 2003
  Sherbrooke 2003–2005
  La Emilia 2005–2006
  Juventud Unida Universitario 2006
  Deportivo Maipú 2007
  Coquimbo Unido 2008–2009

References
 

1971 births
Living people
Argentine footballers
Argentine expatriate footballers
Chilean Primera División players
Newell's Old Boys footballers
Cienciano footballers
L.D.U. Quito footballers
Coquimbo Unido footballers
Deportes La Serena footballers
Unión Española footballers
Santiago Morning footballers
Expatriate footballers in Chile
Expatriate footballers in Peru
Expatriate footballers in Ecuador
Expatriate soccer players in Canada
Association football wingers
Coquimbo Unido managers
Footballers from Buenos Aires